Kimsa Chata (Aymara and Quechua kimsa three, Pukina chata mountain, "three mountains") is a mountain in the Cordillera Real in the Andes of Bolivia, about  high. It is located in the La Paz Department, Los Andes Province, Batallas Municipality, Kirani Canton. It is situated south-west of the mountains Wila Lluxi, Warawarani and Phaq'u Kiwuta, between the mountain Qala T'uxu in the north and the lake Q'ara Quta in the south.

It elevation varies from 4500 to 5056 m (approx) in the worlds longest range of the world (Andes) in South America .

References 

Mountains of La Paz Department (Bolivia)